"Green Groweth the Holly", also titled "Green Grow'th the Holly", is a 16th-century English poem and Christmas carol written by King Henry VIII of England. The carol was written as "a carol for three voices".

Carol 
During Medieval times, carols had started to develop a separate style from ordinary Christian hymns though not necessarily performed just at Christmas. King Henry VIII was a Renaissance monarch who was educated in music and several languages. The King wrote "Green Groweth the Holly" as his own take on the developing Christmas carol style. It is not known exactly when King Henry wrote the carol. In addition to writing the words, the King also composed the music for the carol.

In 1522 the carol was published in "The Henry VIII Book" (manuscript: Add MS 31922). Despite the initial popularity during King Henry's reign, when it had been described as "this little piece by Henry VIII that is one of the half dozen that mark him as the first lyricist of his age", the carol afterwards fell into disfavour and the British Library described it as a "failed classic". The King may have written it as an adaption of the English folk carol "The Holly and the Ivy", but it has been argued that "Green Groweth the Holly" preceded that more famous carol.

Poem 
"Green Groweth the Holly" has also been adapted into a poem. The poem version is more secular and removes references to God in it, with it being re-imagined as a love poem to the unchanging nature of the holly during the winter's weather and the faithfulness of the lover.

References 

Christmas carols
Works by Henry VIII
English music
1522 in England